John "Jack" Flett (November 19, 1871 – December 13, 1932) was a Canadian lacrosse player who competed in the 1904 Summer Olympics. He was born in Kildonan, Manitoba and died in West Vancouver, British Columbia. In 1904 he was member of the Shamrock Lacrosse Team which won the gold medal in the lacrosse tournament.

References

External links
 profile

1871 births
1932 deaths
Olympic lacrosse players of Canada
Lacrosse players at the 1904 Summer Olympics
Olympic gold medalists for Canada
Medalists at the 1904 Summer Olympics
Olympic medalists in lacrosse
20th-century Canadian people